Pia Mia Perez (born September 19, 1996) is an American singer, songwriter, and model. She began her career by posting videos of herself singing on the video sharing site YouTube, and went on to star in commercials and music videos. Pia Mia signed a recording contract with Interscope Records in 2013, subsequently releasing her debut extended play, The Gift, and a series of singles, including "Do It Again" and "Touch". In 2016, she was featured on will.i.am's single "Boys & Girls" which reached the top 40 in the UK Singles Chart. In 2017, Pia Mia independently released an EP entitled The Gift 2. Pia would later leave Interscope Records and become an independent artist in late 2017, creating her own label Cherry Pie Records. Pia briefly signed a record deal with Republic Records and Electric Feel Entertainment in 2020, before separating the following year.

Early life
Pia Mia Perez was born on September 19, 1996, on Guam, an unincorporated territory of the United States. She is of Chamorro descent. She is the daughter of Angela Terlaje Perez and Peter Perez Jr. In Guam, Perez performed at weddings and other community events, before moving to Los Angeles in 2010 with her mother to pursue her music career professionally.

Career

2013–2017: The Gift, The Gift 2 and breakthrough

Perez was discovered by and worked with producer Babyface during her first year in Los Angeles.
Eventually she was introduced to Chris Brown's manager and record executive Abou "Bu" Thiam in 2013. She began working on material with producer Nic Nac and regularly uploaded covers to YouTube. In late 2013, Kylie Jenner, a close friend, invited Perez to a family dinner, during which she was asked to sing her cover of Drake's single "Hold On, We're Going Home", who was also in attendance. Kim Kardashian uploaded a video of the performance to her social media, and it gained over a million views. Following the viral success, she released her first song "Red Love" on December 9, 2013, along with its music video. Her debut extended play The Gift was released online for free later that month with eight tracks.

In February 2014, Pia Mia signed a multi-album deal with American record label Interscope Records. The same month, Perez and Chance the Rapper released an original song "Fight for You" for the 2014 science-fiction action film Divergent. The song was featured on the film's original soundtrack. Perez began working on her debut album in 2014 and recorded roughly 100 songs over the next year.

In early 2015, she released the promotional single "Fuck with U" featuring American rapper G-Eazy. It was initially intended to be the first single from Mia's debut studio album under Interscope, but was later scrapped. On May 4, 2015, Mia released "Do It Again", which featured vocals from Chris Brown and Tyga, and became Mia's first charting song. It has reached No. 8 on the UK Top 40, No. 71 on the US Billboard Hot 100 chart, No. 19 on the Rhythmic Songs chart and No. 70 on the Canadian Hot 100. On October 30, 2015, Mia released follow-up single called "Touch", produced by Stargate and BloodPop. It reached No. 47 in Australia and the UK Singles Chart.

In 2016, Perez was featured on will.i.am's single "Boys & Girls" which peaked in the top 40 on the UK Singles Chart. Perez released the promotional single "We Should Be Together" on December 15, 2016.

On May 25, 2017, Pia released the single "I'm a Fan" featuring Jeremih.  Pia Mia parted ways with Interscope Records and Wolfpack Entertainment, both divisions of Universal Music Group in late 2017. She stated that she didn't have enough creative freedom under the label and that there were excessive delays with her music. On December 15, she self-released her second EP The Gift 2, which was preceded by the promotional single, "Off My Feet", released on December 1, 2017.

2019–present: Acting and label changes
In 2019, Perez made her acting debut, portraying Tristan in the film After. Correspondingly, she released the single, "Bitter Love", which served as the film's theme song. On June 20, 2019, Perez released "Crybaby" featuring Theron Theron as a promotional single. Following this, she released promotional singles "Feel Up" with American rapper YG on September 5, 2019, and "Don't Get Me Started" with rapper Gunna and producer Carnage on October 2, 2019. All four singles were released under Perez's independent record label Cherry Pie Records.

On May 14, 2020, it was announced that Perez had signed to Electric Feel Entertainment and Republic Records. Perez released the single "Princess", her first single released under her new label, on May 15, 2020. In an interview with Idolator, Perez confirmed the release of the single "Hot", which will feature on her upcoming debut studio album. "Hot" was released on July 24, 2020, later accompanied by a visualizer for the song, released on September 14. A remix of the song featuring Sean Paul and Flo Milli was released on October 27, 2020. A visualizer for the remix version was released on October 30.

In 2020, Perez announced that she had written a book titled The Princess Diaries: Sand, Glitter and Silicone which will be released chapter by chapter via Wattpad. In September 2020, it was officially announced that Pia Mia had joined the content subscription service OnlyFans.

On February 14, 2021, Perez released the song "Miss Me" on SoundCloud. Perez announced that the song's release was independent after parting ways with Republic Records and Electric Feel Entertainment. On October 1, 2021, Perez released the My Side EP, which was preceded by the singles "730" and "Only One". The EP is her first since 2017's The Gift 2. A holiday EP titled Christmas was released one month after on November 1, 2021.

Discography

Extended plays

Singles

As lead artist

As featured artist

Promotional singles

Guest appearances

Filmography

Film

Television

Bibliography
 The Princess Diaries: Sand, Glitter and Silicone (2020)

Notes

References

External links
 
 

1996 births
Living people
Guamanian people of Italian descent
Guamanian people of Dutch descent
Guamanian people of Hungarian descent
American people of Chamorro descent
American child singers
Guamanian singers
Guamanian women
Chamorro people
21st-century American women singers
American contemporary R&B singers
American women pop singers
Dance-pop musicians
Child pop musicians
American women hip hop singers